<noinclude>
This is a list of newspapers in Mississippi.

Daily and nondaily newspapers (currently published)
{| class="wikitable sortable"
|-
! Title
! Locale
! Year est.
! Frequency
! Publisher/parent company
! Notes
|-
| Biloxi-D'Iberville Press
| Biloxi/D'Iberville
| 200?
| Weekly
| Bay Newspapers, Inc
| 
|-
| Bolivar Commercial
| Cleveland
| 1915
| Daily
| Richard E. Davis
| 
|-
| Brookhaven Daily Leader
| Brookhaven
| 1968
| Daily
| Southwest Pub.
| 
|-
|  Canton News
|  Canton
|
|  Monthly
|Clay Mansell
|Hyper-local, "good news" newspaper
|-
| Clarion-Ledger
| Jackson/statewide
| 1941
| Daily
| Gannett Company
| 
|-
| Clarksdale Press Register
| Clarksdale
| 1949
| Daily
| Delta Press Pub. Co.
| 
|-
|Columbian-Progress
|Columbia
|1935
|Bi-weekly
|Emmerich Newspapers, Inc.
|
|-
| Columbus Commercial
| Columbus
| 1893-1922
| Daily
| J.T. Senter
| 
|-
| Crystal Springs Meteor 
| Crystal Springs
| 1886-1889
| Weekly
| Hurt & Branch
| 
|-
| Daily Corinthian
| Corinth
| 
| Daily
| 
| 
|-
| Daily Leader
| Brookhaven
| 
| Daily
| 
| 
|-
| Daily Star
| Grenada
| 
| Daily
| 
| 
|-
| Daily Times Leader
| West Point
| 
| Daily
| 
| '
|-
| Darkhorse Press
| Mississippi
| 
| Daily
| 
| 
|-
| Deer Creek Pilot
| Rolling Fork
| 
| Weekly
| 
| 
|-
| Delta Democrat-Times
| Greenville
| 
| Daily
| 
| 
|-
| Enterprise-Journal
| McComb
| 
| Daily
| 
| 
|-
| Enterprise-Tocsin
| Indianola, Mississippi
| 
| Weekly
| 
| 
|-
|Florence News 
|Florence, MS
|2018
|Monthly
|Clay Mansell
|Hyper-local, "good news" newspaper
|-
| Greenwood Commonwealth
| Greenwood
| 
| Daily
| 
| 
|-
| Hattiesburg American
| Hattiesburg
| 
| Daily
| Gannett Company
| 
|-
| Jackson Advocate
| Jackson
| 
| Weekly
| 
| 
|-
| Jackson Free Press
| Jackson
| 
| 
| 
| 
Changed to magazine 2018
|-
| Laurel Leader-Call
| Laurel
| 
| Daily
| 
| 
|-
| Lawrence County Press
| Monticello
| 
| Weekly
| 
| 
|-
|Long Beach Breeze
|Long Beach, MS
|
|Monthly
|Clay Mansell
|Hyper-local, "good news" newspaper
|-
|Madison County Journal
|Ridgeland
|
|Weekly
|
|
|-
| Meridian Star
| Meridian
| 
| Daily
| Community Newspaper Holdings, Inc.
| 
|-
| Mississippi Business Journal
| Jackson/statewide
| 
| Daily
| 
| 
|-
| Mississippi Press
| Pascagoula
| 
| Daily
| 
| 
|-
| Natchez Democrat
| Natchez
| 
| Daily
| 
| 
|-
| Neshoba Democrat
| Philadelphia
| 
| Daily
| 
| 
|-
| New Albany Gazette
| New Albany
| 
| Semi-weekly
| 
| 
|-
| Northeast Mississippi Daily Journal
| Tupelo
| 
| Daily
| 
| 
|-
| The Northside Sun
| Jackson, MS 
| 
| Weekly
| 
| 
|-
| Ocean Springs Record
| Ocean Springs
| 
| Weekly
| 
| 
|-
| Oxford Eagle
| Oxford
| 
| Daily
| 
| 
|-
| Pass Christian Gazebo Gazette
| Pass Christian
| 
| Weekly
| 
| 
|-
|Pearl News
|Pearl, MS
|2018
|Monthly
|Clay Mansell
|Hyper-local, "good news" newspaper
|-
|Pelahatchie News
|Pelahatchie, MS
|
|Monthly
|Clay Mansell
|Hyper-local, "good news" newspaper
|-
| Penny Pincher
| Gulfport
| 
| Weekly
| 
| 
|-
| Picayune Item
| Picayune
| 
| Daily
| 
| 
|-
|Richland News 
|Richland, MS
|2018
|Monthly
|Clay Mansell
|Hyper-local, "good news" newspaper
|-
| Sea Coast Echo
| Bay St. Louis
|
| Semi-weekly
|
|
|-
|Southwest Rankin News
|Pearl, Richland, & Florence, MS
|
|Monthly
|Clay Mansell
|Hyper-local, "good news" newspaper
|-
| Starkville Daily News
| Starkville
| 
| Daily
| 
| 
|-
| Stone County Enterprise
| Wiggins
| 
| Weekly
| 
| 
|-
| Sun Herald
| Biloxi-Gulfport
| 
| Daily
| McClatchy Company
| 
|-
|The Clinton Courier
|Clinton, MS
|
|Bi-Monthly
|Clay Mansell
|Hyper-local, "good news" newspaper
|-
| Vicksburg Post
| Vicksburg<noinclude>
| 
| Daily
| 
| 
|-
|Wesson News
|Wesson
|2013
|Monthly
|Clay Mansell
|Hyper-local, "good news" newspaper
|-
| Woodville Republican
| Woodville| 1824 
| Weekly
| Andy Lewis
| The oldest newspaper in Mississippi
|}

University newspapers
 The Black Sheep - student newspaper of the University of Mississippi
 The Daily Mississippian – student newspaper of the University of Mississippi
 The Reflector – student newspaper of Mississippi State University
  The Mississippi Collegian - student newspaper of Mississippi College
  The Spectator - student newspaper of Mississippi University for Women
 The Student Printz - student newspaper of The University of Southern Mississippi

See also

 Mississippi media
 List of radio stations in Mississippi
 List of television stations in Mississippi
 Media of locales in Mississippi: Biloxi, Gulfport, Hattiesburg, Jackson
 Journalism:
 :Category:Journalists from Mississippi
 University of Southern Mississippi School of Mass Communication and Journalism (est. 2001)
 Mississippi literature

References

Bibliography
 
  
  (1866-1884)
 
 
 
 
 
 
  (Includes information about weekly rural newspapers in Mississippi)
 

External links

 
  (Directory ceased in 2017)
 
 
 
 
 
 

Mississippi
Newspapers